

Soil and grain was a common political term in the Sinosphere for the state. Shejitan, the altars of soil and grain, were constructed alongside ancestral altars. Chinese monarchs of the Ming and Qing dynasties performed ceremonies of soil and grain to affirm their sovereignty at the Beijing Shejitan, while Korean monarchs of the Joseon dynasty did so at the Seoul Sajikdan. It has also been rendered "gods of soil and grain" in English, owing to its associations of prayer and supernatural possibilities. In Vietnam, corresponding soil and grain altars were established at historical capital of Hoa Lư, Thăng Long (Hanoi) and Huế.

During the Chinese Warring States period, ministers defied their rulers by claiming a greater loyalty to the "soil and grain".

A similar concept to sheji is that of the earth deities Tudi and Houtu.

See also
 Tian & Di
 Tudigong & Houtu
 Agriculture in Chinese mythology
 Chinese spiritual world concepts

References

Citations

Bibliography
Yang, C. K. Religion in Chinese Society : A Study of Contemporary Social Functions of Religion and Some of Their Historical Factors (1967 [1961]).  Berkeley and Los Angeles: University of California Press.

Chinese culture
Chinese words and phrases
Names of China
Government